Dead Ringers is a 1988 psychological thriller film starring Jeremy Irons in a dual role as identical twin gynecologists. David Cronenberg directed and co-wrote the screenplay with Norman Snider. Their script was based on the lives of Stewart and Cyril Marcus and on the novel Twins by Bari Wood and Jack Geasland, a "highly fictionalized" version of the Marcuses' story.

The film won numerous honors, including for Irons' performance, and 10 Genie Awards, notably Best Motion Picture. Toronto International Film Festival critics have ranked it among the Top 10 Canadian Films of All Time.

Plot
Twins Elliot and Beverly Mantle are gynecologists who jointly operate a highly successful clinical practice in Toronto that specializes in treating fertility problems. Elliot, the more confident and cynical of the two, seduces women who come to the Mantle Clinic. When he tires of them, the women are passed on to the shy and passive Beverly while the women remain unaware of the substitution.

Actress Claire Niveau comes to the clinic for her infertility where it turns out that she has a "trifurcated cervix", meaning she probably will be unable to have children. Elliot seduces Claire and then urges Beverly to sleep with her. Beverly becomes emotionally attached to Claire, and this upsets the equilibrium between the twins. Beverly also begins sharing Claire's abuse of prescription drugs which he abets through his doctor's authority. When Claire learns that Elliot has been taking sexual advantage of her by impersonating Beverly, she is angry and confronts them both in a restaurant but later decides to continue a relationship with Beverly exclusively.

Eventually, Claire leaves town to work on another film, sending Beverly into clinical depression, more prescription drug abuse and paranoid delusions about "mutant women" with abnormal genitalia. Beverly seeks out metallurgical artist Anders Wolleck and commissions a set of bizarre "gynecological instruments" for operating on these mutant women. Beverly prepares to operate on a patient during surgery with one of Wolleck's tools, while his shocked surgical team exchanges horrified glances. Before he can proceed, the drug-addled doctor drops one of the tools on the ground and then collapses atop the patient, and begins to inhale from her gas mask. Both brothers are immediately suspended from practice and put on administrative leave by the hospital board.

With their medical careers now ruined, Elliot locks Beverly inside the clinic and tries to clean him up, taking pills himself in order to "synchronize" with Beverly. When Claire returns, Beverly leaves the clinic to be with her. After recovering his sobriety, he returns to the clinic which he finds it in shambles and Elliot despondent and intoxicated. Their positions have become reversed as Beverly cares for Elliot. Drugged and despairing, they celebrate their mock birthday and Elliot volunteers to be killed so as to “separate the Siamese twins" and allow Beverly to live his own life. Beverly disembowels Elliot on an examination table with the same claw-like instrument of Wolleck's that he planned to use on his patient in the operating room.

The next morning, Beverly awakens and sees that he killed Elliot during their drug-induced delirium. Devastated, he pulls himself together, leaves the clinic and calls Claire on a pay phone. When she asks "Who is this?" Beverly silently leaves the phone, walks back into the clinic and dies (implicitly from drug withdrawal) in Elliot's dead arms.

Cast

Production

Although Dead Ringers closely follows the case of Stewart and Cyril Marcus, director Peter Greenaway claims that Cronenberg queried him about his film A Zed & Two Noughts for two hours before going on to make Dead Ringers eight months later.

In his DVD commentary, Irons claims that Robert De Niro declined playing the Mantles due to his unease with the subject matter and portraying gynecologists, while William Hurt decided to reject the parts because "it is hard enough to play one role". This movie marked the screen debut of actress Jill Hennessy and her twin sister Jacqueline, who play call girls in one scene of the film.

Irons was given two different dressing rooms with two sets of costumes for playing his two characters. However, given the fact that he said "the whole point of the story is you should sometimes be confused as to which is which", he chose to use only one of the rooms and combine different costume items intended for different characters. Irons also developed an "internal way" to portray each character, employing the Alexander technique for "different energy points", giving each character his own appearance.

A second dream scene was also shot which featured a parasitic twin emerging from Beverly's stomach but this sequence was not used in the final cut.

Adaptation as television series

On August 18, 2020, Amazon Prime Video gave a straight-to-series order with Rachel Weisz set to star. On July 22, 2021, Michael Chernus joined the starring cast. On August 2, 2021, Poppy Liu was cast in a main role.

Reception
On review aggregator Rotten Tomatoes, the film has an approval rating of 84% based on 43 reviews, and an average rating of 7.70/10. The website's critical consensus reads, "Dead Ringers serves up a double dose of Jeremy Irons in service of a devilishly unsettling concept and commandingly creepy work from director David Cronenberg." According to the review aggregator Metacritic, the film received a weighted score of 86 out of 100 indicating “universal acclaim.” Roger Ebert gave the film two and a half stars, writing "it's like a collaboration between med school and a supermarket tabloid", and said it was challenging but interesting for his female friends to view. Ebert also credited Irons for making each twin unique. Variety said Irons portrayed his characters with skill. In The Washington Post, Desson Howe assessed it as "unnerving but also enthralling". For the same paper,  Rita Kempley called it "every woman's nightmare turned into a creepy thriller", adding it was "like slowing down to look at a traffic accident, afraid you might see something. It's really sordid stuff that becomes ridiculous, painful, unbelievable and tedious".

It is the favorite Cronenberg film of Korean director Chan-wook Park and was voted for in the 2002 Sight & Sound poll by Lalitha Gopalan. In 1999, Rolling Stone listed Dead Ringers as 95th on their list of "100 Maverick Movies". Total Film placed Dead Ringers 35th on their list of the "50 Greatest Horror Movies of All Time" while Entertainment Weekly placed it 20th on their list of "The 25 scariest movies of all time".  It was named one of "The Top 10 'True-Story' Horror Movies of All-time!" by Bloody Disgusting.

In 1993, the Toronto International Film Festival Group compiled a Top 10 Canadian Films of All Time list, with festival director Piers Handling writing a lack of Cronenberg films was significant, and that Dead Ringers and Videodrome divided voters, causing neither to win a place on the list. Dead Ringers afterwards ranked sixth in the 2004 update, and seventh in 2015.

Box office
The film grossed $8 million in the United States and Canada. Internationally it grossed $6 million for a worldwide total of $14 million.

Accolades
Irons won critics groups' Best Actor awards for Dead Ringers, and when he won the Academy Award for Best Actor in 1991 for Reversal of Fortune, he thanked Cronenberg in his acceptance speech.

See also
 Look-alike

References

External links
 
 
 
 
 Dead Ringers an essay by Chris Rodley at the Criterion Collection

1988 films
1988 thriller films
1980s psychological thriller films
1980s thriller drama films
20th Century Fox films
American thriller films
American psychological films
American psychological drama films
American psychological thriller films
American thriller drama films
Canadian body horror films
Canadian psychological drama films
Canadian thriller films
Canadian psychological thriller films
English-language Canadian films
1980s English-language films
Films adapted into television shows
Films about sexuality
Films about twin brothers
Films directed by David Cronenberg
Films scored by Howard Shore
Films set in Toronto
Films shot in Toronto
American drama films
Twins in fiction
Best Picture Genie and Canadian Screen Award winners
Medical-themed films
Morgan Creek Productions films
1988 drama films
1980s American films
1980s Canadian films